G.W. Brackenridge High School is a public high school located in central San Antonio, Texas, United States, and classified as a 5A school by the University Interscholastic League (UIL). This school is one of 12 high school schools in the San Antonio Independent School District. In 2017, the school was rated "Met Standard" by the Texas Education Agency

History
The school was founded in 1917 on the city's south side along the San Antonio River near the King William neighborhood. It was named for George Washington Brackenridge.  The original three-story brick structure was demolished and replaced with today's shorter, more sprawling structure in 1974.
That year, the school was renamed in honor of Phillis Wheatley, the first published African-American poet, a woman taken in childhood from West Africa, enslaved and taken to Boston, and eventually freed. In 1988, bowing to some alumni concerns, the school's original name was restored.

Athletics
The Brackenridge Mighty Eagles compete in the following sports:

Baseball
Basketball
Cross Country
Football
Golf
Soccer
Softball
Swimming and Diving
Tennis
Track and Field
Volleyball
Cheerleading

Football
1947 State Champions - Defeated Highland Park 21–13. This was the last title before the UIL divided schools into classifications based on enrollment.
1962 State Champions-Defeated Borger High School 30–26.

Soccer
2018 District Champions-Defeated their rivals Highlands High School 2-1 in the final game of the season

Notable alumni

Robert Cade (Class of 1945) — leader of the research team that created the sports drink Gatorade
Jim Harrison (Class of 1967) — Former NFL running back
Weldon Humble (Class of 1938) — Former NFL offensive guard
Sam Hurd (Class of 2002) — Former NFL wide receiver
Warren McVea (Class of 1964) — Former NFL running back
John Quiñones (Class of 1970) — ABC News co-anchor and host of What Would You Do?
Rudolf Staffel — ceramist, educator

References

External links
 

High schools in San Antonio
San Antonio Independent School District high schools
1917 establishments in Texas